SpeedFerries was a low cost ferry operator which started in May 2004 and continued in business until November 2008.  It operated one route between Dover in England and Boulogne in France.  It had one high-speed ferry, called SpeedOne.

Its founder and CEO was Curt Stavis, originally from Denmark.

History
SpeedFerries was the first low cost fast ferry operator in the English Channel, and faced considerable opposition from the existing ferry operators, whom SpeedFerries accused of acting unfairly and using illegal practices.  These allegations included blocking berths to prevent ferries docking, spying, and hoax bomb scares.  In response, SpeedFerries liveried its ship with 'Fight the Pirates' on the side.

In January 2005, the company was featured in the BBC's Trouble at the Top programme: the edition's name was "Fight the Pirates".   In the amphibious car redux episode of Top Gear (Season 10, Episode 2) the ferry appears in a staged bit where it appears as though it is going to run over James May and Richard Hammond.

Reports in the maritime press indicated that SpeedFerries had secured a second vessel for use in 2007 which was likely to be the Mastercat, a  Incat catamaran which was to be replaced with a larger vessel by its owners, Master Ferries.  However, Master Ferries were unable to secure the larger vessel so Mastercat was no longer available to SpeedFerries.  Sailings to be operated by the second vessel were advertised on the SpeedFerries website.  In May 2008, SpeedFerries bought SpeedOne from Incat.

In February 2007, SpeedFerries signed a lease on the former Dover Hoverport, though not the terminal building, at Dover's Western Docks, and subsequently moved operations there in March 2007.  Once the move was achieved, SpeedFerries was able to provide exclusive facilities in both of its ports as it no longer shared them with other operators.

Arrest
On 6 November 2008, SpeedOne was arrested in Boulogne in a dispute over unpaid taxes.  SpeedFerries issued a statement on its website concerning the situation.

Administration
On 13 November 2008, SpeedFerries went into administration. On 17 November, administrators were appointed and on 26 November the following closure notice was issued:

References

Defunct shipping companies of the United Kingdom
Ferry companies of England
Ferry companies of France
Transport companies established in 2004
Transport companies disestablished in 2008
Companies that have entered administration in the United Kingdom